Liam Joseph Fitzgerald (born 1 September 1949) is an Irish former Fianna Fáil politician.

Fitzgerald was born in Doon, County Limerick and educated at the Christian Brothers school in Doon, St Patrick's College, Dublin and University College Dublin. He worked as a teacher before becoming involved in politics.

He was first elected to Dáil Éireann at the 1981 general election as a Fianna Fáil TD for the Dublin North-East constituency. He lost his seat at the February 1982 election but regained it in the election that November.

In 1991, he was a key member of the so-called "gang of four" that proposed a motion of no confidence in the Taoiseach and leader of Fitzgerald's party, Charles Haughey (the other members of the group were Noel Dempsey, Seán Power and M. J. Nolan). Haughey resigned in early 1992 and Albert Reynolds became Taoiseach, but Fitzgerald remained on the backbenches. He lost his Dáil seat again at the 1997 general election, but was then elected to the 21st Seanad by the Labour Panel; he was re-elected in 2002 to the 22nd Seanad.

Fitzgerald resigned the party whip on 27 March 2007, and stated his intention to run as an independent candidate in the next general election. It has been said that he did this as a response to the cancellation of the candidate selection convention in Dublin North-East. However, he did not stand at the 2007 general election.

References

1949 births
Living people
Local councillors in Dublin (city)
Fianna Fáil TDs
Members of the 22nd Dáil
Members of the 24th Dáil
Members of the 25th Dáil
Members of the 26th Dáil
Members of the 27th Dáil
Members of the 21st Seanad
Members of the 22nd Seanad
Politicians from County Limerick
Alumni of St Patrick's College, Dublin
Alumni of University College Dublin
Irish schoolteachers
Fianna Fáil senators